Bloemhoek Dam, is an earth-fill type dam located on a small river called Jordaan Spruit close to Kroonstad, Free State, province South Africa. It is part of the Vals River System. The Serfontein Dam, which is almost completely silted-up, releases water directly into the Vals River from where it is pumped into the Bloemhoek Dam, for supply to the urban area of Kroonstad. Its main purpose is for municipal and industrial use.

See also 
 List of reservoirs and dams in South Africa
 List of rivers of South Africa

References

Dams in South Africa
Dams completed in 1976
Moqhaka